Bishunpurwa may refer to 

 Bishunpurwa (census code 216654), a village in West Champaran, India. 
 Bishunpurwa (census code 216586), a village in West Champaran, India.